William Lawler may refer to:
William Lawler (farmer-politician)
William Lawler, pathologist in Murder of Kelly Anne Bates and Murder of Suzanne Capper
William Lawler v. Horace B Claflin, see List of United States Supreme Court cases, volume 63

See also
William Lawlor (disambiguation)